Leishmania amazonensis is a parasite responsible for the disease leishmaniasis. This species has been known to spread by using sandflies as its vector and a vertebrate as its primary host, just like other species of Leishmania. They have also been known to spread throughout the Brazilian Amazon region due to their ecological niches needed for survival and reproduction.  However, when the host is infected, the Leishmania can cause 3 different forms of Leishmaniasis. For this species, it has been known to cause cutaneous leishmaniasis and mucocutaneous leishmaniasis. Cutaneous leishmaniasis is commonly characterized with skin lesions, which can appear localized, or throughout the body. While mucocutaneous leishmaniasis is characterized with ulcers around the skin, mouth, and nose. This form of Leishmaniasis has also been known to can spread by metastasis and can be deadly.

References

Leishmaniasis
Trypanosomatida
Parasitic excavates